Ceanothus otayensis, the Otay Mountain buckbrush or Otay Mountain lilac, is a plant species known only from the Otay and San Miguel Mountains of San Diego County, California, and in nearby Baja California, Mexico. It occurs on  dry slopes and brushlands at elevations of 600–1100 m.

Ceanothus otayensis is a shrub up to 120 cm tall, erect, not rooting at the nodes. Leaves are opposite, evergreen, broadly ovate, up to 15 mm long. Flowers are white to pale blue, borne in a spike of umbels. Fruits are spherical, about 5 mm across.

References

otayensis
Flora of California
Flora of Baja California
Natural history of the California chaparral and woodlands
Natural history of the Transverse Ranges
Natural history of San Diego County, California